Deninu School is a JK-12 public school located in Fort Resolution, Northwest Territories, Canada. The school currently represents the only public education option for youth in the hamlet and serves a student population of approximately 95 students. The administration of the school is the responsibility of the South Slave Divisional Education Council (SSDEC).

Background

Dene Kede

The school makes extensive use of Dene Kede, a curriculum developed in the Northwest Territories designed specifically for use in small Dene communities such as Fort Resolution. The goal of the curriculum is to develop "capable Dene" and has a strong focus on developing student relationships with the spiritual world, the land, other people, and themselves. Compared with their peers elsewhere in Canada, students in Fort Resolution spend more significant amounts of educational time on the land and learning about their cultural heritage.

Recognition

Deninu School and its staff have received a number of awards for their success helping to improve education in Fort Resolution:
In late August 2012, a committee of elders working out of Deninu School were presented with an Excellent in Education Award by the South Slave Divisional Education Council for their work in compiling and publishing a comprehensive English to Chipeweyan Dictionary
In June 2012, the entire staff of Deninu was presented with a Premier's Award for Excellence for their work in contributing to education in Fort Resolution
In 2008, principal Moh Odeen was named one of Canada's Outstanding Principal by The Learning Partnership, a Toronto-based NGO

References

External links
Deninu School  at the South Slave Divisional Education Council

High schools in the Northwest Territories
Middle schools in the Northwest Territories
Elementary schools in the Northwest Territories